Trzebieszki is a settlement in the administrative district of Gmina Jastrowie, within Złotów County, Greater Poland Voivodeship, in west-central Poland.

Before 1945 the region was part of Germany (see Territorial changes of Poland after World War II).

References

Trzebieszki